ŽNK Viktorija Slavonski Brod is a Croatian women's association football club based in Slavonski Brod. The club was founded in 1994 and they currently compete in the Croatian Second Division.

Honours
Croatian First Division:
Runners-up (3): 2005, 2009, 2010
Croatian Cup:
Runners-up (1): 2007

Recent seasons

Women's football clubs in Croatia
Football clubs in Brod-Posavina County
Association football clubs established in 1994
1994 establishments in Croatia